The Ramindjeri or Raminjeri people were an Aboriginal Australian people forming part of the Kukabrak grouping now otherwise known as the Ngarrindjeri people. They were the most westerly Ngarrindjeri, living in the area around Encounter Bay and Goolwa in southern South Australia, including Victor Harbor and Port Elliot.  In modern native title actions a much more extensive territory has been claimed.

Country
Ramindjeri Heritage Association Inc assert a historical territory including Karta (Kangaroo Island) and the whole southern portion of the Fleurieu Peninsula, extending as far north as Noarlunga or even the River Torrens. However, the claimed territory overlaps a significant portion of the territory claimed by both the neighbouring Ngarrindjeri to the east and the Kaurna to the west, in their Federal Court Native Title Claims Registered respectively in 1998 and 2000. Linguistic evidence suggests that the "Aborigines" encountered by Colonel Light at Rapid Bay in 1836 were Kaurna speakers. David Horton's map as hosted online by AIATSIS, based largely on Norman Tindale's work, shows Kaurna down the west side of the Fleurieu and Ngarrindjeri to the east of them. The Dreaming story of the Kaurna creator ancestor, Tjilbruke, extends as far west as Rosetta Head.

There is no evidence of continual occupation on Kangaroo Island earlier than the complete separation of the island from the mainland 11,000 years ago. Several small sites dated 6,000, 5,200 and 4,300 years BP have been found, but it is unknown whether these belong to visitors or a remnant population. As available technology precludes intentional visits by Aboriginal people, a remnant population of up to 200 individuals is the preferred hypothesis, with the last dying 2,500 years ago.

Ramindjeri, dubbed "Encounter Bay blacks", were observed holding a full moon ceremony at Onkaparinga by John Bull's 1837 water exploration party, guided by pre-1836 Sealer Nat Thomas.

Ronald and Catherine Berndt's ethnographic study, which was conducted in the 1930s, identified six Kukabrak, subsequently described as "Ngarrindjeri" clans, the Ramindjeri lakinyeri occupying the coast from Cape Jervis to a few kilometres south of Adelaide. Berndt posited that the Ramindjeri clans may have expanded along trade routes as the Kaurna were dispossessed by colonists.

Native title

Ramindjeri lands have been subject to a native title claim lodged by Ngarrindjeri claimants in 1998, determination of which is ongoing. However in 2009, Ramindjeri Heritage Association Inc spokesman Karno Walker challenged the legitimacy of that claim, claiming the Ramindjeri were the rightful owners of land encompassing much of both the 1998 Ngarrindjeri claim and the 2000 Kaurna claim, and calling the Kaurna and Ngarrindjeri "Johnny-come-latelys".

Subsequently, Walker made unofficial claims to land as far north as Tea Tree Gully.

The claim was rejected by the National Native Title Tribunal on 24 March 2011, having failed six of the eleven required preconditions for acceptance, Walker later claimed that eight out of ten had been fulfilled. The Federal Court was set to hear the case in October 2011. The Federal Court published the findings of Mansfield in September 2014 that the application be dismissed.

The native title dispute led one local council to alter their "Acknowledgement of country" statement before meetings. The City of Unley changed their acknowledgement to read "Aboriginal people" instead of "Kaurna", so as not to take sides in the dispute.

Language

The Ramindjeri language was a dialect of the Ngarrindjeri language, with a separate classification in the AUSTLANG database, but is now extinct.

Alternative names
Raminjeri is an alternative spelling, while other variant names and spellings include: Rormear, Ramong, Raminyeri, Ramindjerar, and Ramingara. Ethnonyms used by other peoples include Paruru (meaning "uncircumcised" or "animal") and Wirramu-mejo, both used by Kaurna; and Tarbanawalun, used by the Jarildekald people, to the east of Lake Alexandrina and the River Murray.

Social organisation
The Ramindjeri were composed of 14 clans.

Culture
The Ramindjeri had a genre of tuŋari songs, called mantimanŋari, which were songs of caution, composed to warn or teach lessons to members of the tribe, such as one mocking a recently bereaved woman for appearing to be too much in a hurry to remarry.

History of contact
Ramindjeri were amongst, if not the first South Australian Aboriginal people to come into regular contact with Europeans since 1802, with Karta (Kangaroo Island) based sealers raiding Ramindjeri ruwe (territorial lands) for women. In the early 19th century, pre-1836 settlement.

Ramindjeri men began working as whalers around Encounter Bay in the 1830s.

Victoria Square proposal
After the Adelaide City Council released a master plan for a  million redevelopment for Victoria Square in 2010, Karno Walker, with architect Michael Thiele and community development consultants Encompass Technology, proposed a Ramindjeri-themed redevelopment at a projected cost of  million. They claimed it could be funded by private developers in return for parking revenue from a 2000-space underground carpark.

Notes

Citations

Sources

Also available as <https://flex.flinders.edu.au/file/ae876628-4508-4c12-a442-ad22e8e56fdb/1/Thesis-Malone-2012-11Chapter10.pdf>.

Aboriginal peoples of South Australia
Ngarrindjeri